Justice Jaya Pathirana was a leading Sri Lankan lawyer, Member of Parliament 1961-64 and Supreme Court judge Born 18 April 1921, Died 25 May 2000.

Early life
Pathirana was educated at Jaffna Central College and St. Patrick's College, Jaffna.

Career
Pathirana joined the legal profession after university and served as a defence counsel in different parts of the country.

D. B. Monnekulama, the sitting Member of Parliament, was removed from office on 20 December 1960 after being found guilty by the Bribery Commission. Pathirana contested the ensuing by-election as the Sri Lanka Freedom Party (SLFP) and was elected to Parliament on 29 March 1961.

Pathirana was appointed to the Supreme Court in 1972 Prime Minister Sirimavo Bandaranaike, leader of the SLFP. He held that position until 1978 when the new constitution removed all serving Supreme Court and High Court judges from office.

References

2000 deaths
Alumni of Jaffna Central College
Alumni of St. Patrick's College, Jaffna
Members of the 5th Parliament of Ceylon
Sri Lanka Freedom Party politicians
Sinhalese lawyers
Puisne Justices of the Supreme Court of Sri Lanka
Sinhalese judges
Year of birth missing